Cornell is an unincorporated community in Herdland Township, Clay County, Iowa, United States.

History
Cornell's population was 12 in 1925.

References

Unincorporated communities in Clay County, Iowa
Unincorporated communities in Iowa